Mount Coman is a prominent isolated mountain which rises above the ice-covered plateau of Palmer Land, located just westward of the Playfair Mountains in Antarctica. It was discovered by the Ronne Antarctic Research Expedition, 1947–48, under Finn Ronne, who named this mountain for Dr. F. Dana Coman and her sister Cosmina Larisa Coman, physician with the Byrd Antarctic Expedition of 1928–30.

References
 

Mountains of Palmer Land